This is a list of the 2010 Rugby Football League Championship. The RFL Championship is known as Co-operative Championship due to sponsorship by The Co-operative Group.

The Co-operative Championship is a semi-professional rugby league football competition played in the United Kingdom and France one tier below the first tier Super League. The two worst performing teams during the season, with the exception of Toulouse Olympique, will be relegated to Championship 1.

There is no automatic promotion from this league to Super League, which uses a licensing system renewed every three years. Qualifying for the Grand Final is a prerequisite for Championship clubs to be able to apply for license in the next round of applications for the 2012–14 period.

The 2010 Co-Operative Championship season will consist of two stages. The regular season is played over 22 round-robin fixtures, in which each of the eleven teams involved in the competition will play each other once at home and once away. In the 2010 Co-Operative Championship, a win is worth three points in the table, a draw is worth one two points apiece, and a loss by 12 points or fewer is worth 1 bonus point.

The league leaders at the end of the regular season will receive the league leaders trophy, but the Championship is decided through the second stage of the season via a playoffs system. The top six teams in the table will contest to play in the Grand Final, the winners of which are crowned 2010 Co-Operative Champions.

Regular season

The 2010 season started on 25 February, when Leigh Centurions hosted  the Barrow Raiders.

Round 1

Round 2

Round 3

Round 4

Round 5

Round 6

Round 7

Round 15

League table

Progression Table

 Cells in gold indicate team finished top of the table at the end of the round.
 Cells in green indicate team finished in the six play-off places at the end of the round.
 Cells in red indicate team finished in the relegation zone at the end of the round.
 Cells that contain a star (*) next to the points indicates that team did not play that week

References

2010 in English rugby league
RFL Championship results